was a Japanese politician. He was educated at Chiba Middle School and Chiba First High School, and later graduated from Imperial Tokyo University's Department of Political Science. In 1906, while serving as a Japanese representative in Korea, Kiuchi made a bet with Durham Stevens, an American advisor to the Korean government, about the length of time before Japan would annex Korea. Kiuchi expected it would only take three years; Stevens' guess of five years would prove to be more nearly correct, as the Japan–Korea Annexation Treaty was signed in mid-1910. In January 1909, Kiuchi was one of a number of politicians who brought pressure to bear against Itō Hirobumi and his allegedly soft policies towards Korea, urging that Japan should exercise direct rule there; it was suggested that Kiuchi took this position due to his dissatisfaction with being shifted from Vice-Minister of Home Affairs to Vice-Minister of Agriculture. He later served as a member of the House of Peers and then from 1916–1918 as governor of Kyoto Prefecture.

Kiuchi's former residence, located in Ichikawa, Chiba, was maintained as a historical building and tourist attraction for some years, but was being considered for dismantling .

References

Notes

Sources 
 
 
 

1866 births
1925 deaths
Politicians from Chiba Prefecture
Governors of Kyoto
Members of the House of Peers (Japan)